Make The Love Connection is a split EP featuring tracks by Captain Everything! and Route 215 and was released on the now defunct 20 Deck Recordings.

Track listing
Route 215 - Zombie Movies
Captain Everything! - Just for Paul
Route 215 - Stuck with You
Captain Everything! - Hey! What Happened?
Route 215 - Crunch
Captain Everything! - Gastroenteritis
Route 215 - Nancy
Captain Everything! - Bergerac's Burger-rack

Captain Everything! albums
2001 EPs